Chris Skinner may refer to:

 Chris Skinner (singer) (born 1958), New Zealand singer
 Chris Skinner (Canadian football) (born 1961), Canadian football running back 
 Chris Skinner (EastEnders), fictional character introduced in 2014
 Christopher Skinner, mathematician